Spark M. Matsunaga Hydrogen Research, Development, and Demonstration Act of 1990 is a United States statute establishing a comprehensive five year management program for the domestic distribution, production, and utilization of the lighter than air and diatomic molecule known as hydrogen. The Act of Congress endorsed the development and research of renewable energy and renewable resources for hydrogen production. The United States public law standardized the energy carrier as a critical technology declaring the period 1 element for the expansion of a hydrogen economy within the continental United States.

The United States Senate bill 639 was a supersede to the United States House of Representatives bills H.R. 2793 and H.R. 4521. The Bush Administration bolstered support for the U.S. House bill H.R. 2793 providing initiatives for industry standards as an economic fuel with respect to the hydrogen highway and the hydrogen infrastructure.

Declaration of the Act
The Matsunaga Hydrogen Research and Development Act was authored as nine sections establishing the Title 42 findings, purposes, and definitions for the alternative fuel or hydrogen fuel and energy development resources.

Hydrogen Future Act of 1996
The 104th United States Congress drafted U.S. House bill H.R. 655 as introductory legislation for the hydrogen development and research programs. The Clinton Administration supported the renewable energy bill with the exception regarding obligation limitations concerning all energy supply development and research activities.

The 104th United States Congress passed House Bill H.R. 4138 furthering the continuation of the hydrogen demonstration, development, and research  programs by the United States Department of Energy. The United States energy policy legislation as congressionally endorsed was presented to the President of the United States on September 30, 1996. United States President Bill Clinton enacted the U.S. House renewable energy law on October 9, 1996.

See also

References

Further reading

External links
 
 
 
 
 

101st United States Congress
United States federal energy legislation
Energy policy of the United States
Renewable energy policy in the United States